Otahuhu is a former New Zealand parliamentary electorate in the southern suburbs of the city of Auckland, from 1938 to 1963, and then from 1972 to 1984.

Population centres
The 1931 New Zealand census had been cancelled due to the Great Depression, so the 1937 electoral redistribution had to take ten years of population growth into account. The increasing population imbalance between the North and South Islands had slowed, and only one electorate seat was transferred from south to north. Five electorates were abolished, one former electorate was re-established, and four electorates were created for the first time, including Otahuhu.

For the purposes of the country quota, the 1936 census had determined that some 30% of the population lived in urban areas, and the balance in rural areas. There were 84 electorates for the 1969 election, and the 1972 electoral redistribution saw three additional general seats created for the North Island, bringing the total number of electorates to 87. Together with increased urbanisation in Christchurch and Nelson, the changes proved very disruptive to existing electorates. In the South Island, three electorates were abolished, and three electorates were newly created. In the North Island, five electorates were abolished, two electorates were recreated (including Otahuhu), and six electorates were newly created.

The Otahuhu electorate was located in the south of Auckland. Settlements that fell into the initial Otahuhu electorate were Howick, Papatoetoe, Mangere, Manurewa, and Brookby.

History
In the previous parliamentary term, Petrie had represented the Hauraki electorate, which then had covered the South Auckland suburbs. Petrie retired in 1949.

In the 1963 general election the seat was abolished and Bob Tizard stood in Pakuranga, so only represented Otahuhu from 16 March (after a by-election due to the death of James Deas) to 29 October 1963. He later returned to the seat when it was reconstituted. When it was abolished in 1984, he stood in Panmure.

Members of Parliament
Key

Election results

1981 election

1978 election

1975 election

1972 election

1963 by-election

1960 election

1957 election

1954 election

1951 election

1949 election

1946 election

1943 election

1938 election

Notes

References

Historical electorates of New Zealand
New Zealand electorates in the Auckland Region
1938 establishments in New Zealand
1972 establishments in New Zealand
1963 disestablishments in New Zealand
1984 disestablishments in New Zealand